Wygoda  is a village in the administrative district of Gmina Janów Podlaski, within Biała Podlaska County, Lublin Voivodeship, in eastern Poland, close to the border with Belarus.

The renown Janów Podlaski horse stud farm is located in the village. It is listed as a Historic Monument of Poland.

References

Villages in Biała Podlaska County